Francis Reddington was an Anglican priest in Ireland in the 17th century.

Reddington was educated at Trinity College, Dublin. He was Archdeacon of Dromore  from 1661 until 1663.

Notes

Archdeacons of Dromore
Alumni of Trinity College Dublin
17th-century Irish Anglican priests